
Bishop Brossart High School is a private coeducational, Roman Catholic high school located in Alexandria, Kentucky. Brossart was founded in 1950 and is a part of the Roman Catholic Diocese of Covington.

Background
Bishop Brossart High School currently has an enrollment of 280 students, giving them a national enrollment rank of 2,213th of 7,602, which makes Brossart the 32nd largest private high school in the state of Kentucky. Bishop Brossart currently serves 6 different parishes and is currently led by principle Chris Holtz, along with 34 other professional faculty members. Faculty members at this school include cafeteria workers, utility workers, teachers and even priests who all constantly work together to help students achieve great success. Bishop Brossart also aids students with their religious development as the school offers weekly mass and other religious ceremonies that are also available to the public. Bishop Brossart not only offers valuable educational lessons to students, but also teaches students valuable life lessons that students will carry with them for the rest of their lives. Bishop Brossart even reserves time to help students with career and college planning, as Brossart values their ability to help students grow even after students graduate.

Establishment
In 1950 St. Mary Parish bought a nearby old building and opened their very own school, naming it "St. Mary High School." This brand new school was then under the leadership of its first superintendent, Reverend Francis J. Dejaco, along with the first teachers, Sister Jean and Reverend Brinker. Under the guidance of first three leaders in Bishop Brossart history, the school had its first graduating class of 25 students in 1954. Then eight years later in 1962, St. Mary High changed their name to Bishop Brossart High School in honor of a deceased bishop. From then on, Bishop Brossart continues to serve its community and has been a perfect example of an outstanding educational institute.

Mission
Bishop Brossart over the years since its establishment has adopted their very own "mission" that the school likes to abide by. A "mission" refers to a vocation or calling of a religious organization, in which Bishop Brossart's mission is "to encourage students to embrace the gospel message of Jesus Christ in order to mature spiritually, advance academically, develop physically, and to foster the spirit of charity."

Athletics
Cross Country
 State Championships: 1972, 1984, 1991, 1992, 1997, 1999, 2000, 2001, 2013, 2014, 2017, 2018, 2020
 State Runners-up: 1977, 1980, 1983, 1985, 1986, 1998, 2004, 2002, 2005, 2006, 2010, 2019
 Regional Championships: 18

Girls' Soccer
 All "A" State championship: 2001
 All "A" Regional championships: 2001, 2014, 2015, 2016, 2017, 2018, 2019, 2020
 10th Region Championships: 2013, 2020

Boys' Soccer
 All "A" State Champions: 2005, 2013
 All "A" State Runners-up: 2014
 All "A" Region Champions: 2004, 2013, 2014, 2015, 2016, 2017, 2019, 2020
 10th Region Champions: 2004, 2013

Football
 District Runners-Up: 2015

Volleyball
 All "A" Region Championships: 2009, 2010, 2011, 2012, 2013, 2014, 2015, 2016, 2017, 2019, 2020, 2021

Girls' Basketball
 All "A" State Champions: 2000
 All "A" State Runners-up: 1999, 2001
 All "A" Regional Titles: 12
 10th Region Champions: 2001, 2021

Boys' Basketball
 All "A" State Champion: 2007
 All "A" Regional Titles: 15
 10th Region Championships: 2000

Bowling
 State Championship: 2005

Baseball
 All "A" Regional Champions: 2004-2018
 10th Regional Champions: 2012

Softball
 State Champions: 1998
 Regional Champions: 1993, 1994, 1997, 2002
 All "A" Regional Champions: 2015, 2016

Notes and references

External links
 Official school website
 BMustangs
 School profile, privateschoolreview.com

Catholic secondary schools in Kentucky
Schools in Campbell County, Kentucky
Educational institutions established in 1950
1950 establishments in Kentucky
Roman Catholic Diocese of Covington